Toru Sano (born 14 May 1960 in Yokohama) is a Japanese former professional darts player, who played in Professional Darts Corporation events.

Career
Sano played in the 2004 PDC World Darts Championship, but lost in the last 48 to Wayne Atwood of Wales.

World Championship performances

PDC
 2004: Last 48: (lost to Wayne Atwood 0–3) (sets)

References

External links

1960 births
Living people
Japanese darts players
Professional Darts Corporation associate players